William Hamilton (born 1903) was a Scottish professional footballer who played as a forward.

Career
Born in Musselburgh, Hamilton played for Bellshill Athletic, Bradford City and Southport

For Bradford City he made 13 appearances in the Football League.

Sources

References

1903 births
Year of death missing
Scottish footballers
Bellshill Athletic F.C. players
Bradford City A.F.C. players
Southport F.C. players
English Football League players
Association football forwards